State Route 772 (SR 772) is a north–south state highway in the south-central portion of the U.S. state of Ohio. Its southern terminus is at SR 73 in Rarden. Leaving Rarden, the route increases in elevation to Mount Joy, the highest point in Scioto County. Following these concurrences, SR 772 continues its journey north through scenic terrain and small communities until it reaches its northern terminus at the US 50 and SR 104 concurrence in Chillicothe.

History
The first part of SR 772 brought into the state highway system was the section between SR 124 in Idaho and US 23 just south of its current northern terminus in Chillicothe in 1937. By 1939, the route had been extended south to its current southern terminus in Rarden. Only two major changes have occurred to SR 772's routing: At an unknown year, SR 772's northern terminus was moved from a point along the divided SR 104 highway south of Chillicothe to downtown Chillicothe at US 50 and SR 104; when the Appalachian Highway (SR 32) was constructed , SR 772 was moved off of a winding two-lane road between Elm Grove and Tennyson and onto the newly constructed four-lane divided highway.

Major junctions

References

772
Transportation in Scioto County, Ohio
Transportation in Pike County, Ohio
Transportation in Ross County, Ohio